As of March 2015, the IUCN Red List of Threatened Species identified 6087 data deficient species in the Chordata phylum (Animalia kingdom).

Actinopterygii

Anguilliformes

Ophichthidae

Atheriniformes

Atherinidae

Atherinopsidae

Bedotiidae

Melanotaeniidae

Pseudomugilidae

Beloniformes

Hemiramphidae

Characiformes

Alestidae

Characidae

Distichodontidae

Clupeiformes

Clupeidae

Engraulidae

Cypriniformes

Balitoridae

Catostomidae

Cobitidae

Cyprinidae

Cyprinodontiformes

Aplocheilidae

Cyprinodontidae

Fundulidae

Nothobranchiidae

Poeciliidae

Rivulidae

Gasterosteiformes

Pegasidae

Gonorynchiformes

Kneriidae

Gymnotiformes

Apteronotidae

Rhamphichthyidae

Ophidiiformes

Bythitidae

Osmeriformes

Osmeridae

Osteoglossiformes

Mormyridae

Osteoglossidae

Perciformes

Ambassidae

Anabantidae

Blenniidae

Centrarchidae

Cichlidae

Eleotridae

Gobiidae

Kraemeriidae

Labridae

Latidae

Odontobutidae

Percichthyidae

Percidae

Polyprionidae

Scombridae

Serranidae

Terapontidae

Xiphiidae

Salmoniformes

Galaxiidae

Salangidae

Salmonidae

Scorpaeniformes

Cottidae

Siluriformes

Amblycipitidae

Amphiliidae

Ariidae

Auchenipteridae

Bagridae

Clariidae

Claroteidae

Diplomystidae

Heptapteridae

Ictaluridae

Loricariidae

Mochokidae

Pimelodidae

Schilbeidae

Siluridae

Sisoridae

Trichomycteridae

Synbranchiformes

Mastacembelidae

Synbranchidae

Syngnathiformes

Syngnathidae

Tetraodontiformes

Tetraodontidae

Amphibia

Anura

Amphignathodontidae

Aromobatidae

Arthroleptidae

Brachycephalidae

Brevicipitidae

Bufonidae

Centrolenidae

Ceratobatrachidae

Ceratophryidae

Craugastoridae

Cryptobatrachidae

Cycloramphidae

Dendrobatidae

Dicroglossidae

Eleutherodactylidae

Hemisotidae

Hylidae

Hylodidae

Hyperoliidae

Leiuperidae

Leptodactylidae

Mantellidae

Megophryidae

Micrixalidae

Microhylidae

Myobatrachidae

Nyctibatrachidae

Phrynobatrachidae

Pipidae

Ptychadenidae

Pyxicephalidae

Ranidae

Ranixalidae

Rhacophoridae

Strabomantidae

Caudata

Ambystomatidae

Hynobiidae

Plethodontidae

Salamandridae

Gymnophiona

Caeciliidae

Ichthyophiidae

Rhinatrematidae

Aves

Apodiformes

Apodidae

Trochilidae

Caprimulgiformes

Aegothelidae

Caprimulgidae

Columbiformes

Columbidae

Coraciiformes

Alcedinidae

Falconiformes

Accipitridae

Gruiformes

Rallidae

Turnicidae

Passeriformes

Alaudidae

Campephagidae

Cisticolidae

Cracticidae

Estrildidae

Eupetidae

Fringillidae

Hirundinidae

Melanocharitidae

Meliphagidae

Motacillidae

Muscicapidae

Petroicidae

Ploceidae

Pycnonotidae

Sylviidae

Timaliidae

Vangidae

Zosteropidae

Piciformes

Indicatoridae

Ramphastidae

Procellariiformes

Hydrobatidae

Strigiformes

Strigidae

Tytonidae

Cephalaspidomorphi

Petromyzontiformes

Petromyzontidae

Chondrichthyes

Carcharhiniformes

Carcharhinidae

Hemigaleidae

Proscylliidae

Pseudotriakidae

Scyliorhinidae

Sphyrnidae

Triakidae

Chimaeriformes

Chimaeridae

Rhinochimaeridae

Heterodontiformes

Heterodontidae

Hexanchiformes

Hexanchidae

Lamniformes

Megachasmidae

Odontaspididae

Orectolobiformes

Ginglymostomatidae

Hemiscylliidae

Orectolobidae

Parascylliidae

Pristiophoriformes

Pristiophoridae

Rajiformes

Anacanthobatidae

Arhynchobatidae

Dasyatidae

Gymnuridae

Mobulidae

Myliobatidae

Narcinidae

Narkidae

Platyrhinidae

Potamotrygonidae

Rajidae

Rhinobatidae

Rhinopteridae

Torpedinidae

Urolophidae

Urotrygonidae

Zanobatidae

Squaliformes

Centrophoridae

Dalatiidae

Echinorhinidae

Etmopteridae

Oxynotidae

Somniosidae

Squalidae

Squatiniformes

Squatinidae

Mammalia

Afrosoricida

Chrysochloridae

Tenrecidae

Carnivora

Herpestidae

Viverridae

Cetartiodactyla

Balaenopteridae

Bovidae

Cervidae

Delphinidae

Iniidae

Neobalaenidae

Phocoenidae

Physeteridae

Suidae

Tayassuidae

Tragulidae

Ziphiidae

Chiroptera

Emballonuridae

Hipposideridae

Molossidae

Nycteridae

Phyllostomidae

Pteropodidae

Rhinolophidae

Rhinopomatidae

Thyropteridae

Vespertilionidae

Cingulata

Dasypodidae

Dasyuromorphia

Dasyuridae

Didelphimorphia

Didelphidae

Diprotodontia

Macropodidae

Phalangeridae

Eulipotyphla

Erinaceidae

Soricidae

Talpidae

Lagomorpha

Leporidae

Ochotonidae

Macroscelidea

Macroscelididae

Notoryctemorphia

Notoryctidae

Peramelemorphia

Peramelidae

Primates

Aotidae

Atelidae

Callitrichidae

Cebidae

Cercopithecidae

Cheirogaleidae

Galagidae

Hylobatidae

Indriidae

Lemuridae

Lepilemuridae

Lorisidae

Pitheciidae

Tarsiidae

Rodentia

Abrocomidae

Anomaluridae

Bathyergidae

Calomyscidae

Caviidae

Chinchillidae

Cricetidae

Ctenodactylidae

Ctenomyidae

Dasyproctidae

Dipodidae

Echimyidae

Erethizontidae

Geomyidae

Gliridae

Heteromyidae

Muridae

Nesomyidae

Octodontidae

Sciuridae

Spalacidae

Scandentia

Tupaiidae

Reptilia

Squamata

Agamidae

Anguidae

Anomochilidae

Colubridae

Elapidae

Gekkonidae

Lacertidae

Leptotyphlopidae

Phrynosomatidae

Polychrotidae

Scincidae

Teiidae

Tropiduridae

Typhlopidae

Viperidae

Xantusiidae

Xenosauridae

Testudines

Chelidae

Cheloniidae

Emydidae

Kinosternidae

Pelomedusidae

Testudinidae

Trionychidae

References
 IUCN 2014. IUCN Red List of Threatened Species, v2014.3. Source of the above list: online IUCN Red List. Retrieved d.d. 7 March 2015.

Chordata